Phillip K. Billings (born 1939) is a former Australian amateur golfer.

Golfing career 
He was part of the winning Australian team at the 1966 Eisenhower Trophy in Mexico City. As national captain, he led his country to a tie with Great Britain at the Commonwealth Tournament in 1963. He has won the Lake Macquarie Amateur the most times, winning on seven occasions (1959, 1960, 1961, 1964, 1965, 1966, 1974). He was the medalist in the 1961 Australian Amateur and won the New South Wales Amateur the same year.

Billings also competed in professional events. He won the 1961 Lakes Open and was a runner-up in the 1971 New South Wales Open.

Personal life 
For his career, Billings worked as a schoolteacher.

Tournament wins 

 1959 Lake Macquarie Amateur
 1960 Lake Macquarie Amateur
 1961 New South Wales Amateur Championship, Lake Macquarie Amateur, Lakes Open
 1964 Lake Macquarie Amateur
 1965 Lake Macquarie Amateur
 1966 Lake Macquarie Amateur
 1974 Lake Macquarie Amateur

Team appearances
Eisenhower Trophy (representing Australia): 1962, 1964, 1966 (winners)
Commonwealth Tournament (representing Australia): 1963 (joint winners), 1967
Sloan Morpeth Trophy (representing Australia): 1961, 1964 (winners), 1965, 1966 (winners), 1967 (winners)
Australian Men's Interstate Teams Matches (representing New South Wales): 1957 (winners), 1958 (winners), 1959 (winners), 1960 (winners), 1961, 1962 (joint winners), 1963, 1964 (winners), 1965 (winners), 1967 (winners), 1968, 1969 (winners), 1970 (winners), 1971, 1972 (winners), 1974, 1982

References

Amateur golfers
Australian male golfers
People from the Hunter Region
Sportsmen from New South Wales
20th-century Australian people
1939 births
Living people